Yauyos is a town in Central Peru, capital of the province Yauyos in the region Lima.  The city is the seat of the Territorial Prelature of Yauyos.

References

Populated places in the Lima Region